The 1996 Women's Home Nations Championship was the first Women's Home Nations Championship and was won by England, who achieved the Triple Crown. England also gained the Grand Slam by beating France outside of the championship.

Final table

Results

See also
Women's Six Nations Championship
Women's international rugby union

References

External links
The official RBS Six Nations Site

1996
1996 rugby union tournaments for national teams
1995–96 in Irish rugby union
1995–96 in English rugby union
1995–96 in Welsh rugby union
1995–96 in Scottish rugby union
rugby union
rugby union
1995–96 in European women's rugby union
rugby union
rugby union
Women's Home Nations
Women's Home Nations
Women's Home Nations